The Wonder is a 2022 period psychological drama film directed by Sebastián Lelio.  Emma Donoghue, Lelio, and Alice Birch wrote the screenplay based on the 2016 novel of the same name by Donoghue. Set shortly after the Great Famine, it follows an English nurse sent to a rural Irish village to observe a young 'fasting girl', who is seemingly able to miraculously survive without eating. Florence Pugh leads an ensemble cast that includes Tom Burke, Niamh Algar, Elaine Cassidy, Dermot Crowley, Brían F. O'Byrne, David Wilmot, Ruth Bradley, Caolán Byrne, Josie Walker, Ciarán Hinds, Toby Jones, and Kíla Lord Cassidy.

The Wonder premiered at the Telluride Film Festival on 2 September 2022. It had a limited theatrical release on 2 November 2022 and streamed on Netflix on 16 November 2022. It received positive reviews from critics who praised the production design and cast performances, particularly Pugh's.

Plot
In 1862, Elizabeth "Lib" Wright, an English nurse who served in the Crimean War, is sent to a rural village in Ireland where she is tasked with closely watching Anna O'Donnell, a fasting girl who according to her family has not eaten for four months. She is to be assisted by a nun, Sister Michael, and the two are to report their findings independently to a council of local dignitaries.

The trauma of the Great Famine still looms over the community, and many locals are wary of the English nurse. Lib meets Anna's deeply religious family: her mother Rosaleen, her father Malachy and her elder sister Kitty. At dinner, Lib learns that Anna's elder brother died of an unknown illness. Anna herself appears in good health and says she has been kept alive by consuming "manna from Heaven".

At her lodgings, Lib encounters William Byrne, a man who grew up locally and whose family perished in the Great Famine while he was away at boarding school. Now a journalist for the Daily Telegraph, William is reporting on the story, which he believes to be a hoax. Lib and William begin a relationship.

Lib's observations initially reveal no evidence of deception. Anna prays many times a day and speaks of the fate of the damned in Hell. Lib, who is grieving the death of her only child, takes laudanum to help her sleep.

Noticing that her mother kisses Anna goodnight on her mouth while cupping her face, Lib deduces that chewed food is being covertly passed to Anna. She forbids the family from touching her. Anna does not deny that this is her "manna", and she discloses to Lib the reasons for her fast: her elder brother had repeatedly raped her, and she attributes his death to God's wrath. Anna believes that by her fasting and prayers she will free her brother's soul.

Separated from her family's touch, Anna's condition worsens. William files a report to his paper in which he lays the blame for Anna's expected death on her family and the community.

Lib informs the council of her findings, but they refuse to believe her. Sister Michael states that she has found no evidence of Rosaleen feeding Anna. Members of the council question Anna, but she repeats that she is sustained solely by "manna from Heaven".

Knowing that Anna will inevitably die unless she eats soon, Lib pleads with the family to take action, or at least for her mother to resume the kisses. Rosaleen refuses, saying that after Anna's sacred death, both her children will be in heaven. Lib persuades William to assist with a rescue plan.

While the family are at mass, Lib brings Anna, now near death, to a nearby holy clootie well. She tells her that although "Anna" will die, she will be reborn as a new girl named "Nan". Anna closes her eyes and appears to die. When she revives, Lib is finally able to feed her. Lib returns to the house alone and sets it ablaze, at the same time deliberately destroying her laudanum bottle.

Lib tells the council that Anna died of natural causes, and that the fire was an accident. Concerned for their own possible culpability for Anna's death, and the absence of a body within the charred remains of the house, they terminate her employment without pay. Sister Michael tells Lib that, after leaving mass early, she saw a vision of Anna and an angel leaving the area on horseback. She asks Lib to promise that Anna has gone to a better place, which Lib does.

In Dublin, Lib reunites with William and Nan, who has recovered her health. The three pose as a family named Cheshire and set sail for Sydney.

Cast
 Florence Pugh as Elizabeth "Lib" Wright
 Kíla Lord Cassidy as Anna O'Donnell / Nan
 Tom Burke as William Byrne
 Niamh Algar as Kitty O'Donnell / The Narrator
 Elaine Cassidy as Rosaleen O'Donnell
 Caolán Byrne as Malachy O' Donnell
 Toby Jones as Dr McBrearty
 Ciarán Hinds as Father Thaddeus
 Dermot Crowley as Sir Otway
 Brían F. O'Byrne as John Flynn
 David Wilmot as Seán Ryan
 Ruth Bradley as Maggie Ryan
 Josie Walker as Sister Michael

Production
On 28 April 2021, it was announced that Florence Pugh was set to star in Sebastián Lelio's adaptation of The Wonder. Principal photography began in Ireland on 12 August 2021. Accompanying the announcement of the start of production, it was reported that Tom Burke, Niamh Algar, Elaine Cassidy, Kíla Lord Cassidy, Toby Jones, Ciarán Hinds, Dermot Crowley, Brían F. O'Byrne and David Wilmot had joined the cast.

Release 
The Wonder premiered at the Telluride Film Festival on 2 September 2022, followed by a screening at the 2022 Toronto International Film Festival on 13 September 2022. Its European premiere was at the 70th San Sebastián International Film Festival on 21 September  2022. It was released on Netflix on 16 November 2022, following a limited theatrical release on 2 November.

Reception
 

Reviewing the film following its premiere at Telluride, David Ehrlich of IndieWire called it a "sumptuous but slightly undercooked tale", praising Lelio's direction, the performances, the cinematography, and the score. Peter Bruge praised the cast performances in his review for Variety but criticized the screenplay, summarizing it as an "evenhanded but ultimately preposterous adaptation". The Hollywood Reporter’s Stephen Farber found it an "illuminating study of dark prejudices" and commended Pugh's performance, as well as Lelio's direction which he said represents perhaps his "finest achievement to date".

The film has been likened to folk horror, with Meara Isenberg of CNET noting its "rural setting, religious foreboding and general sense of dread". Ed Power of the Irish Examiner described it as "Famine trauma meets folk horror", calling it a "gripping film ... full of buried secrets and festering evil".

Accolades

References

External links
 

2020s American films
2020s British films
2020s English-language films
2020s psychological drama films
2022 independent films
American psychological drama films
British psychological drama films
Christian fasting
English-language Netflix original films
Films about Catholicism
Films about nurses
Films based on Irish novels
Films directed by Sebastián Lelio
Films set in the 1860s
Films set in 1862
Films set in Ireland
Irish drama films